Below is a list of Delta Sigma Theta (ΔΣΘ) members (commonly referred to as Deltas). The sorority was founded on January 13, 1913, at Howard University and was first incorporated in Washington, D.C., on February 9, 1913. On January 20, 1930, the organization was incorporated as a perpetual body. The nomenclature of graduate chapters are named according to geographic location and "Alumnae" annexed to the service area's name.

"Delta Girl"

The poem "Delta Girl" was written by honorary member Mary McLeod Bethune. The poem embodies the ideals of a Delta Sigma Theta woman.

Listed below are notable members of Delta Sigma Theta, and includes the founders, presidents, and members who excel in various fields including arts and entertainment, business, civil rights, education, health, law, politics, science, and sports.

Founders

National presidents

Arts and entertainment

Actresses

Artists and illustrators

Authors

Dancers

Miss America winners

Mrs. World, Mrs. United States, Mrs. U.S. Beauties

Miss USA winners

Singers and musicians

Television and radio

Civil rights

Education

Heads of organizations and business executives

Health and science

Legal profession

Judges

Law enforcement

Law – other

Military

Political figures

Humanitarian and social causes

Non-elected officials

U.S. politicians

World leaders

Religion

Sports

See also

 Delta Sigma Theta
 List of Delta Sigma Theta National Conventions
 List of Delta Sigma Theta chapters

Citations

References

External links 

 Delta Sigma Theta Sorority, Incorporated official website

List of Sisters
Lists of members of United States student societies